

2002 D1 Grand Prix Point Series
n.b. Winning Driver are mentioned on the right

Round 1 - February 22/23 - Bihoku Highland Circuit, Okayama Prefecture, Japan - Katsuhiro Ueo (AE86)
Round 2 - April 19/20 - Ebisu South Course, Fukushima Prefecture, Japan - Nobuteru Taniguchi (S15)
Round 3 - May 5/6 - Sports Land SUGO, Miyagi Prefecture, Japan - Masatoshi Asamoto (FD3S)
Round 4 - July 7 - Tsukuba Circuit, Ibaraki Prefecture, Japan - Youichi Imamura (FD3S)
Round 5 - August 13/14 - Ebisu South Course, Fukushima Prefecture, Japan - Kouichi Yamashita (S15)
Round 6 - September 28/29 - Sekia Hills, Kumamoto Prefecture, Japan - Ken Maeda (AE86)
Round 7 - November 11 - Nikkō Circuit, Tochigi Prefecture, Japan - Youichi Imamura (FD3S)

Final Championship Results

Source: D1GP Official Site 2002 Championship table

See also
 D1 Grand Prix
 Drifting (motorsport)

Sources
D1GP Results Database 2000-2004

D1 Grand Prix seasons
D1 Grand Prix
2002 in Japanese motorsport